Tekmen is a village in the Black Sea Region of Turkey, in Osmancık District of Çorum Province. Its population is 190 (2022). Though it is in the Black Sea Region, it carries typical properties of villages of the Central Anatolia Region. The village economy is based on agriculture and animal husbandry. At the beginning of the 1970s, the Tekmen people began to emigrate from the village to the surrounding cities. Since then, the population of Tekmenians has decreased by around 3,000.

The village consists of five rural districts: Central Tekmen, Karataş, Yukarısaltuk, Aşağısaltuk, and Bağlar. Each district consists of specific families. For example, only the Soruklu family live in Karataş, and in Bağlar only the Hacılars and Hacıyusufs.

Education 
Hüseyin Gülburun was appointed as a teacher to the village in 1945. He taught reading and writing to prepare students for primary school. Many of his former students have become civil servants. The second teacher to come to the village was Mehmet Kazanan. The Tekmen primary school is currently closed, and the students go to school in Osmancık.

Economy 

The economy of Tekmen is based on cattle breeding and agriculture. Sheep and goats are also raised. Barley, wheat, oats, and rye are the cereal crops produced, along with lentils, chickpeas, and white beans. There is also a tile factory in the village.

Politics 
Election results in Tekmen since 1950:
 1950 – Democrat Party
 1954 – Democrat Party
 1957 – Republican People's Party
 1961 – Unknown
 1965 – Justice Party
 1969 – Justice Party
 1973 – National Salvation Party
 1977 – Republican People's Party
 1983 – Motherland Party
 1987 – Republican People's Party
 1991 – True Path Party
 1995 – Democratic Left Party
 1999 – Democratic Left Party
 2002 – Republican People's Party
 2007 – Justice and Development Party

Tekmen Association 
Tekmen people began to emigrate from the village at the beginning of the 1970s to cities both for education and to earn a living. The population has decreased by some 3,000 people, who periodically return to visit their grandfathers and grandmothers.

In late 2007, the village founded an association named "Tekmen Association of Regional Development, Solidarity, Cooperation, Education, Culture, Youth and Sport". The goals of the association are to develop the region and the community socially, economically, to protect the culture, to make the area a better place to live, to enhance solidarity and cooperation between natives and others, to assure people's right to live freely, to perform necessary social, cultural, economic, and sportive studies for youth, and to prepare projects based on these goals.

Upland Festival 
Every year at the end of July, the Upland Festival is celebrated in Tekmen Village. Tekmenians come together at an upland of the village and enjoy entertainment for seven days. People come from all over Turkey.

The festival hosts traditional wrestling, folk dances, Halay, local games, mini competitions, a football match, local or traditional foods, local singers, the musical instrument Saz, and other activities.

References

External links 
 www.tekmenkoyu.gov.tr Official Web-Site of Local Self-Government of Tekmen Village (in Turkish)

Villages in Osmancık District